The 1994 Australian Individual Speedway Championship was held at the Olympic Park Speedway in Mildura, Victoria on 22 January 1994. Two time defending champion Leigh Adams won his third straight Australian Championship and his first with a 15 point maximum. Jason Lyons finished second for the second straight year while Jason Crump, the son of dour time Australian Champion Phil Crump finished third making it an all-Mildura rider podium.

1994 Australian Solo Championship
 22 January 1994
  Mildura - Olympic Park Speedway
 Referee: 
 Qualification: The top four riders plus one reserve go through to the Commonwealth Final in King's Lynn, England.

References

See also
 Australia national speedway team
 Sport in Australia

Speedway in Australia
Australia
Individual Speedway Championship
Sport in Mildura